Besiberri Massif is a mountain massif of the central area of the Pyrenees, Lleida, Catalonia, Spain. It is located at the western limit of the Aigüestortes i Estany de Sant Maurici National Park.

Most main summits of the Besiberri Massif are three-thousanders. The highest point is Comaloforno with an altitude of 3029 metres above sea level. The other main summits are Besiberri Sud (3024 m), Besiberri Nord (3008 m), Besiberri del Mig (2995 m) and Punta Senyalada (2952 m).

See also
List of Pyrenean three-thousanders
Geology of the Pyrenees
Mountains of Catalonia

References

External links 
 Ressenya des Cavallers

Mountains of Catalonia
Mountains of the Pyrenees
Alta Ribagorça